Salve Regina (HWV 241) is an antiphon composed by George Friederic Handel around 1707. It is most likely that the work was first performed for Trinity Sunday in Vignanello on 19 July 1707 in the Church of Santa Maria in Montesanto, under the patronage of the Colonna family. Other catalogues of Handel's music have referred to the work as HG xxxviii, 136 (there is no HHA designation of the work).

The work is based on the Marian anthems with their supplicatory text.

A typical performance lasts nearly 12 minutes.

Movements
The opening and closing movements are slow and reflective and frame a vigorous allegro movement.

The work has the following three movements:

See also
 List of Latin church music by George Frideric Handel

References

External links
 (HWV 241 starts on page 136)

Compositions by George Frideric Handel
H
1707 compositions